Robert Robinson (23 June 1921 – 1975) was an English professional footballer who played as a goalkeeper for Sunderland.

References

1921 births
1975 deaths
Sportspeople from Ashington
Footballers from Northumberland
English footballers
Association football goalkeepers
Burnley F.C. players
Sunderland A.F.C. players
Newcastle United F.C. players
English Football League players